The 1908 French Grand Prix was a Grand Prix motor race held at Dieppe on 7 July 1908.

Formula Changes

The race was run under a new formula agreed in Ostend in 1907. There was no fuel consumption limit, but the cars had a minimum weight of 1100 kilograms, and a maximum cylinder bore of 155 millimetres.
This formula differed from the regulations in place for the American Vanderbilt Cup series, which discouraged American manufacturers from entering the race. Lewis Strang drove the single American entrant, the Thomas Flyer. D. Napier & Son cars were disqualified from the race due to their use of Rudge-Whitworth center locking hubs, which the organizers believed were unsafe.

The Race

Christian Lautenschlager won the race in his Mercedes finishing nearly nine minutes ahead of Victor Hémery's Benz. The race was notable for tragic reasons. Henri Cissac's car lost a tyre and rolled, killing Cissac and Jules Schaube, his riding mechanic.
This was the first fatal accident in Grand Prix history.

Classification

References

French Grand Prix
French
1908 in French motorsport